St Joseph's School, Addis Ababa, is a private Catholic primary and secondary school for boys, located near Meskel Square, in Addis Ababa, Ethiopia. Founded by the Institute of the Brothers of the Christian Schools, more commonly known as the Lasallian Brothers, in 1959, the school is continued to be operated by the Brothers who provide an education to approximately 1,500 boys. Scholarships enable needy and deserving students to attend the school.

History
The school was founded in 1959 by the Lasallian Brothers and was staffed by American Brothers. Established for the wealthy and ruling class, after the revolution in the 1970s the school mainly caters for the children of civil servants and small traders.

The school enrolls 1,500 boys, with classes between grades 1 and 12.  Currently, the school is staffed almost entirely by lay teachers including the administration.

The Lasallian Brothers conduct schools and colleges all over the world in eighty countries including five schools in Ethiopia: (Dire Dawa, Addis Ababa (2), Adama (also known as Nazret) and the Meki Catholic School (near Lake Zway).

See also

 Education in Ethiopia
 List of schools in Ethiopia
 Lideta Catholic Cathedral School

References

1959 establishments in Ethiopia
Boys' schools in Africa
Educational institutions established in 1959
Addis Ababa
Catholic elementary and primary schools in Ethiopia
Catholic secondary schools in Ethiopia
Schools in Addis Ababa